The Little Girl Next Door is a 1923 American silent drama film directed by W.S. Van Dyke and starring Pauline Starke, James Morrison, and Carmel Myers. It was also released under the alternative title You Are in Danger.

Cast
 Pauline Starke as Mary Slocum
 James Morrison as Jim Manning
 Carmel Myers as 	Milly Amory
 Mitchell Lewis as Tug Wilson
 Edgar Kennedy as Hank Hall

References

Bibliography
 Connelly, Robert B. The Silents: Silent Feature Films, 1910-36, Volume 40, Issue 2. December Press, 1998.

External links
 

1923 films
1923 drama films
1920s English-language films
American silent feature films
Silent American drama films
American black-and-white films
Films directed by W. S. Van Dyke
1920s American films